William H. Sherman (born 26 January 1966) is an American-born British academic who currently serves as director of the Warburg Institute.

Biography 
Sherman was born on 26 January 1966, in Saint Paul, Minnesota. He received his B.A. from Columbia University in 1988, a M.Phil. and Ph.D. from the University of Cambridge.

Sherman taught English at the University of Maryland, College Park from 1993 to 2004, before moving to the University of York, where he taught English literature from 2005 to 2013, and founded its Centre for Renaissance & Early Modern Studies, of which he also served as director until 2011.

He joined Victoria and Albert Museum as head of research in 2014, and was named director of research and collections in 2016.

In 2017, he was named director of the Warburg Institute at the School of Advanced Study, University of London.

References 

1966 births
People from Saint Paul, Minnesota
Columbia College (New York) alumni
Alumni of the University of Cambridge
Directors of the Warburg Institute
University of Maryland, College Park faculty
British academics of English literature
American academics of English literature
People associated with the Victoria and Albert Museum
British archivists
American archivists
Living people